Sheikh Sadruddin was a chief of the jagir of Maler and an ancestor of the rulers of the Malerkotla State. He received the area of Maler as jagir from Bahlul Lodi after getting married to his daughter Taj Murassa in 1454. He belonged to Sherwani tribe of Afghanistan.

Early life
Sheikh Sadruddin was the son of Sheikh Ahmed Jinda Pir and grandson of Shekh Ali Shahbaj Khan. He was spiritually inclined from childhood. In 1449, he settled at the bank of a Sutlej river (Bhumsi) to engage in religious activities.

Marriage
In 1451 one night, Sultan Bahlul Lodi camped at Maler on his way to conquer Delhi. It was a stormy night and the only lamp aflame was in the hut on the mound. Bahlul went to meet the man whose lamp the harsh winds could not extinguish. Sheikh Sadruddin welcomed Bahlul into his hut and prophesied that Delhi would indeed be his. When Bahlul accomplished his mission (after conquering Delhi) the Sultan returned and in 1454 married his daughter Taj Murassa Begum to Sheikh Sadruddin, and gave her a number of villages in the region as a marriage portion. The Sheikh and his Afghan wife had two children–a daughter, Bibi Mangi, and a son, Sheikh Hassan Muhammad. In 1458, Sheikh Sadruddin also married Bhatiyaniji Murtaza Begum, the daughter of Rai Bahram Bhatti (the Bhati Rajput ruler of Kapurthala - a nearby principality) and had two more sons, Sheikh Muhammad Isa and Musa.

Career
He sometimes served as Sadar-i-Jahan (Chief Judicial Officer) during the reign of Bahlul Lodi.

Death
The Sheikh died in 1515 C.E. He was buried at the same place where he always used to pray. Other family members of the family were also buried near the Mazaar of Sheikh Sardarud-din. According to a history written by Iftikhar Ali Khan, the last Nawab of the Malerkotla State; Bayazid Khan (Six Generation of Baba Hazrat Sheikh) was responsible for the building of the tomb shrine, Baba Hazrat Sheikh Dargah.

References

15th-century Indian people
History of Punjab
1515 deaths